The Psychiatrist is an American drama series about a young psychiatrist with unorthodox methods of helping his patients. Roy Thinnes played the title role of Dr. James Whitman. Luther Adler co-starred as Dr. Bernard Altman, the older psychiatrist with whom Whitman worked. Two episodes of the short-lived series, "The Private World of Martin Dalton" and "Par for the Course," were directed by Steven Spielberg. The regular hour-long series ran from February 3, 1971, to March 10 of the same year.

The pilot for the series, a made-for-TV movie called The Psychiatrist: God Bless the Children, aired on December 14, 1970. Actor Pete Duel was at the center of this two hour drama, as Casey Poe, a former drug addict who, after finishing a two-year prison sentence, must battle his own personal demons, as well as the prejudices of others, in order to reenter society. Dr. Whitman is the psychiatrist who must break through Poe's resistance in order to help him form a new life for himself. Duel received much praise for his performance and reprised his role in the first regular episode of the series, "In Death's Other Kingdom."

The Psychiatrist was an element in the wheel series Four in One, which NBC aired in the 10 PM Eastern time slot during its 1970-71 series.  The Psychiatrist was the final series of the four to air, following the first-run conclusions of the other three components, McCloud, Night Gallery, and San Francisco International Airport.  After all four series had completed their initial six-episode runs, reruns of the four were interspersed with each other until the end of the summer.  Of the four elements, McCloud was picked up as one element of a new wheel-format series, the NBC Mystery Movie, and Night Gallery was picked up as a stand-alone series, while San Francisco International Airport and The Psychiatrist were cancelled with no further episodes ordered beyond the original six.

Cast
Roy Thinnes as Dr. James Whitman
Luther Adler as Dr. Bernard Altman

Episode list

References

External links
 
The Psychiatrist at CVTA

NBC original programming
1970s American drama television series
Television series by Universal Television
1970 American television series debuts
1971 American television series endings
English-language television shows